Hamdy Fathy Abdelhalim Abdelfattah (born 29 September 1994) is an Egyptian professional footballer who plays as a midfielder for Egyptian Premier League club Al Ahly and Egyptian national team.

On 14 October 2019, Fathy made his international debut and scored the only goal in a 1–0 win against Botswana. Hamdy featured in the 2021 AFCON final match against Senegal.

Career statistics
Last updated on 19 September 2022

Club

InternationalScores and results list Egypt's goal tally first.''

Honours
Al Ahly
 Egyptian Premier League: 2018–19, 2019–20
 Egypt Cup: 2019–20
 Egyptian Super Cup: 2018–19, 2021–22
 CAF Champions League: 2019–20, 2020-21
 FIFA Club World Cup Third-Place: 2020, 2021
 CAF Super Cup: 2021 (May), 2021 (December)

References

External links

 
 

1994 births
Living people
Egyptian footballers
Egypt international footballers
ENPPI SC players
Petrojet SC players
Ala'ab Damanhour SC players
Al Ahly SC players
Egyptian Premier League players
Association football forwards
2021 Africa Cup of Nations players
People from Beheira Governorate